Bianca is a feminine given name. It means "white" and is an Italian cognate of Blanche.

Variants 

 Blanche: French
 Bianca: Italian
 Bianka (Polish, Hungarian, Slovak, German, English, French, Icelandic, Finnish, Dutch, Norwegian, Corsican, Romanian, Spanish, Greek, Czech)
 Blanca (French, English, Icelandic, Hungarian, Spanish)

People

Medieval period
In chronological order
Bianca Lancia (c. 1200–c. 1233), Italian noble
Bianca of Savoy (1337–1387), Lady of Milan by marriage
Bianca Maria Visconti (1425–1468), Duchess of Milan
Bianca Maria Sforza (1472–1510), Holy Roman Empress, wife of Maximilian I
Bianca Cappello (1548–1587), Grand Duchess of Tuscany

Modern era

A–K
Bianca Andreescu (born 2000), Canadian tennis player
Bianca Atzei (born 1987), Italian singer
Bianca Balti (born 1984), Italian model
Bianca Beauchamp (born 1977), Canadian model
Bianca Belair (born 1989), American professional wrestler 
Bianca Bianchi (1855–1947), stage name of Bertha Schwarz, German/Austrian opera soprano
Bianca Bin (born 1990), Brazilian actress
Bianca Brandolini d’Adda (born 1987), Italian socialite
Bianca Butler (born 1989), American ice skater
Bianca Byington (born 1966), Brazilian actress
Bianca Carstensen (born 1975), Danish rower
Bianca Castanho (born 1979), Brazilian actress
Bianca Chatfield (born 1982), Australian netball player
Bianca Chiminello (born 1976), Australian model and actress
Bianca Collins (born 1988), American actress
Bianca Comparato (born 1985), Brazilian actress
Bianca Ferguson, American actress
Bianca Gascoigne (born 1987), British model and TV personality
Bianca Gonzalez (born 1983), Filipina TV personality
Bianca Jagger (born 1945), Nicaraguan actress, social and human rights advocate
Bianca Kajlich (born 1977), American actress
Bianca Kappler (born 1977), German long jumper
Bianca King (born 1986), Canadian–Filipina actress, model

L–Z
Bianca Lamblin (1921–2011), French writer
Bianca Langham-Pritchard (born 1975), Australian field hockey player
Bianca Manalo (born 1987), Filipina actress and beauty pageant titleholder
Bianca Marroquín, Mexican actress
Bianca Lawson (born 1979), American actress
Bianca Netzler (cyclist) (born 1974), New Zealand cyclist representing Samoa
Bianca Netzler (field hockey) (born 1976), Australian field hockey player
Bianca Odumegwu-Ojukwu (born 1968), Nigerian beauty queen, politician, diplomat, lawyer, and businesswoman; wife of former Biafran President, Chukuemeka Odumegwu Ojukwu
Bianca Răzor (born 1994), Romanian sprinter
Bianca Rinaldi (born 1974), Brazilian actress
Bianca Ryan (born 1994), American singer
Bianca Solorzano (born 1974), American TV journalist
Bianca Szíjgyártó (born 1981), Hungarian ice dancer
Bianca Tiron (born 1995), Romanian handballer
Bianca Umali (born 2000), Filipina actress, model
Bianca van Rangelrooy (born 1959), New Zealand artist
Bianca Weiß (born 1968), German field hockey player

Fictional characters
Bianca (Othello), from William Shakespeare's play Othello
Bianca Minola, from William Shakespeare's play The Taming of the Shrew
Bianca Stratford, in the 1999 movie based on The Taming of the Shrew, 10 Things I Hate About You
A character from Bianca e Fernando, an 1828 opera by Vincenzo Bellini
Bianca, played by Mariah Carey in the video for her 1999 single "Heartbreaker" and in "Boy (I Need You)"
Bianca (That's So Raven), from the American TV series That's So Raven
Bianca Castafiore, recurring character in The Adventures of Tintin
Bianca DeSousa, in Degrassi
Bianca di Angelo, a minor character in the Percy Jackson and the Olympians series by Rick Riordan
Bianca Jackson, from the British soap opera EastEnders
Bianca Montgomery, from the American soap opera All My Children
Bianca Solderini, in Anne Rice's The Vampire Chronicles
Miss Bianca, from The Rescuers books by Margery Sharp and the animated films The Rescuers and The Rescuers Down Under
Bianca Erdmann, a pre-pubescent nymphomaniac in Thomas Pynchon's novel Gravity's Rainbow
Bianca Reyes, mother of Blue Beetle (Jaime Reyes) in the DC Comics continuum
Bianca Scott, from the Australian soap opera Home and Away
Bianca, the name of Varric's crossbow in Dragon Age II
Bianca, an anatomically correct doll in Lars and the Real Girl
Bianca, from the movie Pokémon Heroes
Bianca, in The Lego Movie 2: The Second Part
Bianca, rival character in Pokémon Black and White
Bianca, from the American TV series Henry Danger
Bianca Piper, from the book and movie The Duff
Bianca, from the TV series Brooklyn Nine-Nine
 Bianca Lussi, another main character from the TV series Maggie & Bianca: Fashion Friends
Bianca, a character and former villain from Spyro: Year of the DragonBianca, from Dragon QuestBianca Dupree, from the 1987 cartoon Beverly Hills Teens''

See also

bianca.com
Bianka, a feminine given name
Branca, a feminine given name
Branka, a feminine given name
Blanche (given name), a feminine given name
Blanca (given name), a feminine given name
Blanka (given name), a feminine given name

References

Italian feminine given names
English feminine given names
Greek feminine given names
Feminine given names
Romanian feminine given names
Spanish feminine given names
Portuguese feminine given names

fr:Bianca